APD-40 or APD 40 refers to a road composed of the U.S. Route 64 Bypass (US 64 Byp.) and a section of State Route 60 (SR 60) which forms a partial beltway around the business district of Cleveland, Tennessee. The route takes its name from its part of Corridor K of the Appalachian Development Highway System, and is sometimes called Appalachian Highway or simply the Cleveland Bypass. The route is also designated as Veterans Memorial Highway. The US 64 Byp. section of the road is also multiplexed with unsigned State Route 311 (SR 311) and US 74, and is also known as the US 74 Bypass. The road is a four-lane divided highway its entire length and parts are controlled-access. The bypass is an east-west route and the state route is a north-south.

Route description 

APD-40 begins at the exit 20 interchange on Interstate 75 (I-75) as US 64 Byp. This is also the western terminus of Corridor K. Beginning as controlled-access, it rounds a minor curve to the southeast and enters a long straightaway on the edge of the city limits of Cleveland, and comes to an interchange first with the Cherokee Gateway and then US 11/US 64 (South Lee Highway) approximately  later. It then crosses Lead Mine Ridge, junctions at an interchange with Blue Springs Road, a connector to Red Clay State Park in southern Bradley County, and crosses another Norfolk Southern railroad. The road travels for about a mile through a business and residential area before crossing SR 60 (Dalton Pike) and intersecting with McGrady Drive, which is a connector to SR 60. The road then curves sharply to the northeast and becomes a limited access highway, coming to an interchange with SR 74 (Spring Place Road) about  later. Bypassing Cleveland to the east on the edge of East Cleveland, the route enters a straightaway, and about a mile later, APD-40 again becomes a freeway, interchanging with US 64 in a cloverleaf interchange and becoming SR 60. Here the ADHS corridor splits from the route and continues east on US 64 into North Carolina. The road curves slightly to the northwest and has an interchange with Benton Pike. It then has an interchange with Overhead Bridge Road, crosses a Norfolk Southern line, and finally has an interchange with 20th Street NE, before curving again to the northwest where the freeway ends and the road becomes 25th Street, entering into the metropolis of Cleveland. The road intersects with US 11 (Ocoee Street) about a half mile (0.8 km) later and I-75 about  beyond this point, continuing north eventually to Dayton.

History

Construction and early history
The route that is now APD-40 was originally proposed and built to relieve congestion and divert commercial through traffic away from downtown Cleveland that increased as a result of industrial and residential growth. The first section, located between I-75 and South Lee Highway, was constructed at the same time as the corresponding section of I-75 between Ooltewah and northern Cleveland, and opened at the same time in October 1966.

Extension of the route to US 64, 
a project that also included widening of US 64 in Bradley County, was authorized in January 1969. The contract to construct the segment between Blythe Avenue and US 64 was awarded on November 19, 1971, and the segment was opened to traffic in April 1973 and completed four months later. The final portion, located between US 64 and US 11, was authorized in December 1971. Awarded in two separate contracts, the first construction phase began in April 1973, and the second phase in February 1974. The section was opened to traffic in November 1974, and completed the following month. This section was not in the original plan; the original plan called for the road to end at US 64, but it was later decided to extend it to US 11 (Ocoee Street) and 25th Street NE, and form a complete beltway. SR 60 originally turned south about  past the interchange with I-75 and went directly to downtown, but was moved to 25th Street NW in the mid 1960s after being widened, and the section of APD-40 to US 64 after opening.

The first segment of APD-40 was initially signed as part of State Route 40, which is part of the origin of the name APD-40. It became known as the U.S. Route 64 Bypass and the State Route 40 Bypass after construction began on the extension. In 1982, after TDOT modified the highway numbering system for state highways, the SR 40 Bypass was replaced with SR 311. US 74 was added to the route in 1986. This route, however, remains largely unsigned.

Traffic hazards
 In 1973 a four-way intersection with Varnell Road, located at the bottom of the steep downgrade on the western slope of Candies Creek Ridge was reconstructed with an overpass after many accidents, including one with fatalities, occurred immediately after being opened to traffic. Prior to construction, the then-incumbent superintendent of the Bradley County Road Department had reportedly requested TDOT to make this change to the design, but they had refused. Other portions of the road, including interchanges, have also received criticism as being hazardous and poorly designed.

Recent developments
APD-40 was designated as "Veterans Memorial Highway" by the Tennessee General Assembly in 2007.

In May 2013, the Tennessee Department of Transportation (TDOT) began a project to rework the interchange with I-75. The original route narrowed at the interchange, and crossed the interstate on a two-lane bridge. The project was declared complete on December 16, 2015. The old bridge was replaced with a six-lane bridge, and the ramps were rebuilt and widened, with turn lanes added.

Construction began on a new interchange with the newly constructed Cherokee Gateway located about midway between I-75 and South Lee Highway in 2015. The interchange had been proposed since at least 2009, and connects to what is now an industrial park. It was completed in May 2017 and was named in honor of Cleveland's mayor Tom Rowland.

In 2016, the parallel bridges across 20th Street, the railroad, and Overhead Bridge Road were designated as the Dustin Ledford Memorial Bridge in honor of a man who was killed by an intoxicated driver near the Overhead Bridge Road exit.

Major intersections

See also 

Paul Huff Parkway

References

External links 

Appalachian Development Highway System
U.S. Route 64
U.S. Route 74
Transportation in Bradley County, Tennessee
Roads in Tennessee
Tennessee State Route 60
Beltways in the United States
Freeways in Tennessee